In physics, the fine-structure constant, also known as the Sommerfeld constant, commonly denoted by  (the Greek letter alpha), is a fundamental physical constant which quantifies the strength of the electromagnetic interaction between elementary charged particles. 

It is a dimensionless quantity, independent of the system of units used, which is related to the strength of the coupling of an elementary charge e with the electromagnetic field, by the formula .

The constant was named by Arnold Sommerfeld, who introduced it in 1916 when extending the Bohr model of the atom.  quantified the gap in the fine structure of the spectral lines of the hydrogen atom, which had been measured precisely by Michelson and Morley in 1887.

Definition
In terms of other fundamental physical constants,  may be defined as:

where
 is the elementary charge;
 is the Planck constant;
 is the reduced Planck constant, 
 is the speed of light;
 is the electric constant.

Since the 2019 redefinition of the SI base units, the only quantity in this list that does not have an exact value in SI units is the electric constant.

Alternative systems of units
The electrostatic CGS system implicitly sets , as commonly found in older physics literature, where the expression of the fine-structure constant becomes

A nondimensionalised system commonly used in high energy physics sets  where the expressions for the fine-structure constant becomes

As such, the fine-structure constant is just a quantity determining (or determined by) the elementary charge:  in terms of such a natural unit of charge.

In the system of Hartree atomic units, which sets , the expression for the fine-structure constant becomes

Measurement

 = .
This has a relative standard uncertainty of 

This value for  gives , 3.6 standard deviations away from its old defined value, but with the mean differing from the old value by only 0.54 parts per billion.

Historically the value of the reciprocal of the fine-structure constant is often given. The 2018 CODATA recommended value is
 = .

While the value of  can be determined from estimates of the constants that appear in any of its definitions, the theory of quantum electrodynamics (QED) provides a way to measure  directly using the quantum Hall effect or the anomalous magnetic moment of the electron. Other methods include the A.C. Josephson effect and photon recoil in atom interferometry.
The preferred methods in 2019 are measurements of electron anomalous magnetic moments and of photon recoil in atom interferometry. The theory of QED predicts a relationship between the dimensionless magnetic moment of the electron and the fine-structure constant  (the magnetic moment of the electron is also referred to as the electron -factor ). The most precise value of  obtained experimentally (as of 2012) is based on a measurement of  using a one-electron so-called "quantum cyclotron" apparatus, together with a calculation via the theory of QED that involved  tenth-order Feynman diagrams:
 = .

This value and uncertainty are about the same as the latest experimental results.

Further refinement of the experimental value was published by the end of 2020, giving the value
 = ,

Physical interpretations
The fine-structure constant, has several physical interpretations.  is:

On the other hand, the large value of the corresponding factors in quantum chromodynamics makes calculations involving the strong nuclear force extremely difficult.

Variation with energy scale
In quantum electrodynamics, the more thorough quantum field theory underlying the electromagnetic coupling, the renormalization group dictates how the strength of the electromagnetic interaction grows logarithmically as the relevant energy scale increases. The value of the fine-structure constant  is linked to the observed value of this coupling associated with the energy scale of the electron mass: the electron is a lower bound for this energy scale, because it (and the positron) is the lightest charged object whose quantum loops can contribute to the running. Therefore,  is the asymptotic value of the fine-structure constant at zero energy. 
At higher energies, such as the scale of the Z boson, about 90 GeV, one instead measures an effective  ≈ 1/127.

As the energy scale increases, the strength of the electromagnetic interaction in the Standard Model approaches that of the other two fundamental interactions, a feature important for grand unification theories. If quantum electrodynamics were an exact theory, the fine-structure constant would actually diverge at an energy known as the Landau pole – this fact undermines the consistency of quantum electrodynamics beyond perturbative expansions.

History

Based on the precise measurement of the hydrogen atom spectrum by Michelson and Morley in 1887,
Sommerfeld extended the Bohr model to include elliptical orbits and relativistic dependence of mass on velocity. He introduced a term for the fine-structure constant in 1916.
The first physical interpretation of the fine-structure constant  was as the ratio of the velocity of the electron in the first circular orbit of the relativistic Bohr atom to the speed of light in the vacuum.
Equivalently, it was the quotient between the minimum angular momentum allowed by relativity for a closed orbit, and the minimum angular momentum allowed for it by quantum mechanics. It appears naturally in Sommerfeld's analysis, and determines the size of the splitting or fine-structure of the hydrogenic spectral lines. This constant was not seen as significant until Paul Dirac's linear relativistic wave equation in 1928, which gave the exact fine structure formula.

With the development of quantum electrodynamics (QED) the significance of  has broadened from a spectroscopic phenomenon to a general coupling constant for the electromagnetic field, determining the strength of the interaction between electrons and photons. The term  is engraved on the tombstone of one of the pioneers of QED, Julian Schwinger, referring to his calculation of the anomalous magnetic dipole moment.

History of measurements
{| class="wikitable"
|+ Successive values determined for the fine-structure constant
! Date
! 
! 
! Sources
|-
| 1969 Jul
| 0.007297351(11)
| 137.03602(21)
| CODATA 1969
|-
| 1973
| 0.0072973461(81)
| 137.03612(15)
| CODATA 1973
|-
| 1987 Jan
| 0.00729735308(33)
| 137.0359895(61)
| CODATA 1986
|-
| 1998
| 0.007297352582(27)
| 137.03599883(51)
| Kinoshita
|-
| 2000 Apr
| 0.007297352533(27)
| 137.03599976(50)
| CODATA 1998
|-
| 2002
| 0.007297352568(24)
| 137.03599911(46)
| CODATA 2002
|-
| 2007 Jul
| 0.0072973525700(52)
| 137.035999070(98)
| Gabrielse (2007)
|-
| 2008 Jun 2
| 0.0072973525376(50)
| 137.035999679(94)
| CODATA 2006
|-
| 2008 Jul
| 0.0072973525692(27)
| 137.035999084(51)
| Gabrielse (2008), Hanneke (2008)
|-
| 2010 Dec
| 0.0072973525717(48)
| 137.035999037(91)
| Bouchendira (2010)
|-
| 2011 Jun
| 0.0072973525698(24)
| 137.035999074(44)
| CODATA 2010
|-
| 2015 Jun 25
| 0.0072973525664(17)
| 137.035999139(31)
| CODATA 2014
|-
| 2017 Jul 10
| 0.0072973525657(18)
| 137.035999150(33)
| Aoyama et al. (2017)
|-
| 2018 Dec 12
| 0.0072973525713(14)
| 137.035999046(27)
| Parker, Yu, et al. (2018)
|-
| 2019 May 20
| 0.0072973525693(11)
| 137.035999084(21)
| CODATA 2018
|-
| 2020 Dec 2
| 0.0072973525628(6)
| 137.035999206(11)
| Morel et al. (2020)
|}

The CODATA values in the above table are computed by averaging other measurements; they are not independent experiments.

Potential time-variation

Physicists have pondered whether the fine-structure constant is in fact constant, or whether its value differs by location and over time. A varying  has been proposed as a way of solving problems in cosmology and astrophysics.
String theory and other proposals for going beyond the Standard Model of particle physics have led to theoretical interest in whether the accepted physical constants (not just ) actually vary.

If the fine-structure constant really is a constant, then any experiment should show that

or as close to zero as experiment can measure. Any value far away from zero would indicate that  does change over time. So far, most experimental data is consistent with  being constant.

Past rate of change
The first experimenters to test whether the fine-structure constant might actually vary examined the spectral lines of distant astronomical objects and the products of radioactive decay in the Oklo natural nuclear fission reactor. Their findings were consistent with no variation in the fine-structure constant between these two vastly separated locations and times.

Specifically, they found that

This is a very small value, but the error bars do not actually include zero. This result either indicates that  is not constant or that there is experimental error unaccounted for.

In 2004, a smaller study of 23 absorption systems by Chand et al., using the Very Large Telescope, found no measurable variation:

However, in 2007 simple flaws were identified in the analysis method of Chand et al., discrediting those results.

This suggests that the statistical uncertainties and best estimate for  stated by Webb et al. and Murphy et al. are robust.

Lamoreaux and Torgerson analyzed data from the Oklo natural nuclear fission reactor in 2004, and concluded that  has changed in the past 2 billion years by 45 parts per billion. They claimed that this finding was "probably accurate to within 20%". Accuracy is dependent on estimates of impurities and temperature in the natural reactor. These conclusions have to be verified.

In 2007, Khatri and Wandelt of the University of Illinois at Urbana-Champaign realized that the 21 cm hyperfine transition in neutral hydrogen of the early universe leaves a unique absorption line imprint in the cosmic microwave background radiation.
They proposed using this effect to measure the value of  during the epoch before the formation of the first stars. The European LOFAR radio telescope would only be able to constrain  to about 0.3%. The collecting area required to constrain  to the current level of quasar constraints is on the order of 100 square kilometers, which is economically impracticable at the present time.

Present rate of change
In 2008, Rosenband et al.
Note that any present day null constraint on the time variation of alpha does not necessarily rule out time variation in the past. Indeed, some theories
that predict a variable fine-structure constant also predict that the value of the fine-structure constant should become practically fixed in its value once the universe enters its current dark energy-dominated epoch.

Spatial variation – Australian dipole
Researchers from Australia have said they had identified a variation of the fine-structure constant across the observable universe.

These results have not been replicated by other researchers.  In September and October 2010, after Webb et al.'s released research, physicists C. Orzel and S.M. Carroll separately suggested various approaches of how Webb's observations may be wrong. Orzel argues
that the study may contain wrong data due to subtle differences in the two telescopes
a totally different approach; he looks at the fine-structure constant as a scalar field and claims that if the telescopes are correct and the fine-structure constant varies smoothly over the universe, then the scalar field must have a very small mass. However, previous research has shown that the mass is not likely to be extremely small. Both of these scientists' early criticisms point to the fact that different techniques are needed to confirm or contradict the results, a conclusion Webb, et al., previously stated in their study.

Other research finds no meaningful variation in the fine structure constant.

Anthropic explanation
The anthropic principle is an argument about the reason the fine-structure constant has the value it does: stable matter, and therefore life and intelligent beings, could not exist if its value were very different.   needs to be between around 1/180 and 1/85 to have proton decay to be slow enough for life to be possible.

Numerological explanations and multiverse theory
As a dimensionless constant which does not seem to be directly related to any mathematical constant, the fine-structure constant has long fascinated physicists.

Arthur Eddington argued that the value could be "obtained by pure deduction" and he related it to the Eddington number, his estimate of the number of protons in the universe.
This led him in 1929 to conjecture that the reciprocal of the fine-structure constant was not approximately but precisely the integer 137.
By the 1940s experimental values for  deviated sufficiently from 137 to refute Eddington's arguments.

The fine-structure constant so intrigued physicist Wolfgang Pauli that he collaborated with psychoanalyst Carl Jung in a quest to understand its significance.
Similarly, Max Born believed that if the value of  differed, the universe would degenerate, and thus that  =  is a law of nature.

Richard Feynman, one of the originators and early developers of the theory of quantum electrodynamics (QED), referred to the fine-structure constant in these terms:

Conversely, statistician I. J. Good argued that a numerological explanation would only be acceptable if it could be based on a good theory that is not yet known but "exists" in the sense of a Platonic Ideal.

Attempts to find a mathematical basis for this dimensionless constant have continued up to the present time. However, no numerological explanation has ever been accepted by the physics community.

In the early 21st century, multiple physicists, including Stephen Hawking in his book A Brief History of Time, began exploring the idea of a multiverse, and the fine-structure constant was one of several universal constants that suggested the idea of a fine-tuned universe.

Quotes

See also
 Dimensionless physical constant
 Electric constant
 Hyperfine structure
 Planck constant
 Speed of light

Footnotes

References

External links

  (adapted from the Encyclopædia Britannica, 15th ed. by NIST)
  
Physicists Nail Down the ‘Magic Number’ That Shapes the Universe (Natalie Wolchover, Quanta magazine, December 2, 2020). The value of this constant is given here as 1/137.035999206 (note the difference in the last three digits). It was determined by a team of four physicists led by Saïda Guellati-Khélifa at the Kastler Brossel Laboratory in Paris.
 
 
 
 

Dimensionless numbers
Electromagnetism
Fundamental constants
Arnold Sommerfeld